Gerry McInerney may refer to:

 Gerry McInerney (Galway hurler) (born 1965), retired Irish hurler
 Gerry McInerney (Clare hurler) (born 1961), Irish hurler

See also
 Geraldine McInerney, Ireland's first female television newsreader